Frýdštejn is a municipality and village in Jablonec nad Nisou District in the Liberec Region of the Czech Republic. It has about 800 inhabitants.

Administrative parts
Villages and hamlets of Anděl Strážce, Bezděčín, Borek, Horky, Kaškovice, Ondříkovice, Roudný, Sestroňovice, Slapy and Voděrady are administrative parts of Frýdštejn.

Geography

It lies on the border between the Jičín Uplands and Ještěd–Kozákov Ridge.

History
The first written mention of Frýdštejn is from 1385.

Sights
Frýdštejn is known for the ruins of the Frýdštejn Castle. Existence of this rock castle was first documented in 1385. It was abandoned in the second half of the 16th century.

Drábovna is a small sandstone rock town with remains of a medieval castle and an archaeological site.

On the Kopanina Hill there is an eponymous observation tower.

Notable people
Zdeněk Hoření (1930–2021), journalist

References

External links

Villages in Jablonec nad Nisou District